John Andrew W. Drysdale (born 31 May 1926) was a Progressive Conservative party member of the House of Commons of Canada. He was a barrister and lawyer by career. He graduated from the University of British Columbia with a Bachelor of Arts degree in 1949, then a Bachelor of Laws degree in 1952.

Drysdale was first elected at the Burnaby—Richmond riding in the 1958 general election, after an unsuccessful attempt to win the seat there in the 1957 election. After serving his only term, the 24th Canadian Parliament, Drysdale was defeated in the 1962 election by Bob Prittie of the New Democratic Party.

References

External links
 

1926 births
Living people
Lawyers in British Columbia
Members of the House of Commons of Canada from British Columbia
Politicians from Winnipeg
Progressive Conservative Party of Canada MPs
University of British Columbia alumni
Peter A. Allard School of Law alumni